is a Japanese actor and singer from Onagawa, Miyagi. He graduated from Keio University.

Nakamura joined the Bungakuza theater troupe in 1973 and made his television debut in 1974 with "Warera Seishun. Masatoshi made his film debut with "Fureai" in the same year . He won his first major award at the Elan d'or Awards in 1975. In 1977, he married actress Junko Igarashi. In 2012, he played the role of Fumimaro Konoe in the Peter Webber's  film Emperor.

As a singer his first single "Fureai" peaked at number 1 in the Japanese single record chart in 1974. Besides "Fureai" he has several other hit songs such as "Oretachi no Tabi" and "Koibito mo Nureru Machikado". "Nakamura appeared in the Kōhaku Uta Gassen in 1982 and 2012.

Selected filmography

Film

Television

Dubbing
Chicken Little (Buck Cluck)

Selected Discography

Singles
Fureai (1974)
Shiroishashinkan (1974)
Itsuka Machide Attanara (1975)
Oretachi no Tabi (1975)
Bongaeri (1976)
Oretachi no Matsuri (1977)
Jidaiokureno Kuibitotach (1978)
Kokorono Iro (1981)
Koibitomo Nurerumachikado (1982)
Hittokino Ai (1983)
Sayonaraga Einakute (1987)
Anataniagetai Aigaaru (1989)
Kazeno Sumumachi (1990)
Zackbaran (1991)
Aiwakokoniaru (1997)
Kanashi Hito (1999)
Aitsu (2001)
Utsusemi (2005)
Namida (2008)
Hajimeteno Sora (2015)
Naraba Kazetoike (2016)
Dokoetokiga Nagaretemo (2017)
Daro!! (2018)

Albums
Fureai (1974)
Sayonarano Suigara (1976)
Omoideno Kakera (1976)
Karashiiro no Arubamu (1977)
Seishun Horoki (1978)
Shy Guy Masatoshi (1979)
Kimito Keita E (1980)
Restoration (1982)
BORN NEW (1983)
MONDAY MORNING BLUES (1984)
OUVas-tu? (1985)
MONO (1986)
I LOVE YOU, ALL (1987)
Ordinary Life (1988)
ACROSS THE UNIVERSE (1988)
Tokino Shozo (1991)
Rabu songwo Okuritai (1993)
HEART OF ENERGY (1994)
WITHOUT YOU (1996)
Ah Seishun (1999)
STEPPING STONES (2000)
Wasurenai MASATOSHI NAKAMURA 40th Anniversary(2014)
Masatoshi Nakamura 45th Anniversary Single Collection 〜yes! on the way〜 (2019)

References

External links

Masatoshi Nakamura's official website Nippon Columbia
Masatoshi Nakamura on NHK

Japanese male actors
Living people
1951 births